Coçoço is a populated place in the Cuanza Sul Province of Angola. It is located in the jurisdiction of Uaco Cungo.

References

Populated places in Cuanza Sul Province